Lieberthal may refer to:

People
Kenneth Lieberthal, director of the John L. Thornton China Center
Mike Lieberthal, Major League Baseball All Star catcher